Andreas Kelires (born 1 July 1999) is a Greek-Cypriot chess grandmaster. He is a two-time Cypriot Chess Champion.

Chess career
Born in 1999, Kelires won the Cypriot Chess Championship in 2013 and 2014. He earned his international master title in 2015 and his grandmaster title in 2016. He transferred to Greece in 2016. He is the No. 8 ranked Greek player as of February 2018. In March 2018, he competed in the European Individual Chess Championship. He placed one-hundred-and-thirty-seventh, scoring 5½/11 (+5–5=1).

References

External links

1999 births
Living people
Chess grandmasters
Cypriot chess players
Greek chess players
Sportspeople from Nicosia